Taiyuan Riverside Sports Centre Gymnasium is an indoor sporting arena located along the Fen River in Taiyuan, Shanxi, China. The capacity of the arena is 5,331 spectators and opened in 1998. It hosts indoor sporting events such as basketball and volleyball. It hosts the Shanxi Loongs of the Chinese Basketball Association (CBA).

References

Indoor arenas in China
Sports venues in Shanxi